Rao Biram Singh Ji Rathore ( 1515) was a sixteenth century ruler of Marwar. He was the grandson of his predecessor Suja.

References

16th-century Indian monarchs
Monarchs of Marwar
Year of birth missing
1515 deaths

Category:Indian_history_stubs